Sapiens, a Latin word meaning "one who knows", may refer to:

People
 Berengarius Sapiens, a designation for Berengar the Wise, count of Toulouse (814-835) and duke of Septimania (832-835)
 Cato the Elder (234 BC–149 BC), known by the cognomen Sapiens; a Roman statesman
 Cenn Fáelad mac Aillila (died 679), referred to sapiens; an Irish scholar
 Gaius Laelius Sapiens (c. 188 BC-?), a Roman statesman
 Gildas Sapiens, a designation for Saint Gildas (c. 500–570), a 6th-century British cleric

Fiction
 Felis sapiens (also Felix sapiens), a fictional, sentient, humanoid species from the Red Dwarf television series
 Icthyo sapiens is a species designation given to at least two fictional characters:
 The Mariner, played by Kevin Costner in the sci-fi film Waterworld 
 Abe Sapien, a fictional character in the Hellboy comic book series

Other
 Homo sapiens, the scientific name for human beings
 Hydro Sapiens, an art performance performed by The Lunatics from the Netherlands
 Robo-Sapiens, the debut album by Malibu
 Sapiens International Corporation, a computer software company
Sapiens: A Brief History of Humankind, 2014 book by Yuval Harari
 Vipera Sapiens, an EP by Brazilian heavy metal band Viper
 We the Sapiens, a voluntary organisation affiliated to Humanist International and Atheist Alliance International
 Sapiens, an anthropology magazine

See also
 Sapience
 Sapient (disambiguation)
 Sapienza

Latin words and phrases